Dawn is an outdoor 1971 bronze sculpture by Helen Journeay, installed at Hermann Park's McGovern Centennial Gardens in Houston, Texas, in the United States. It depicts a nude woman and a fawn, and rests on brick pedestal. The statue was previously installed inside the entrance to the Houston Garden Center.

See also
 1971 in art
 List of public art in Houston

References

External links
 

1971 establishments in Texas
1971 sculptures
Animal sculptures in Texas
Bronze sculptures in Texas
Deer in art
Hermann Park
Nude sculptures in Texas
Outdoor sculptures in Houston
Sculptures of women in Texas
Statues in Houston